The 2019–20 New York Rangers season was the franchise's 93rd season of play and their 94th season overall.

The season was suspended by the league officials on March 12, 2020, after several other professional and collegiate sports organizations followed suit as a result of the ongoing COVID-19 pandemic. On May 26, the NHL regular season was officially declared over with the remaining games being cancelled. The Rangers advanced to the playoffs for the first time since the 2016–17 season, but were swept in the qualifying round by the Carolina Hurricanes.

Standings

Divisional standings

Conference standings

Schedule and results

Pre-season
The preseason schedule was published on June 18, 2019.

|- style="background:#fcc;"
| 1 || September 18 || New Jersey Devils || 3–4 || 0–1–0
|- style="background:#fcc;"
| 2 || September 20 || @ New Jersey Devils || 2–4 || 0–2–0
|- style="background:#fcc;"
| 3 || September 21 || @ Philadelphia Flyers || 1–4 || 0–3–0
|- style="background:#cfc;"
| 4 || September 24 || New York Islanders || 3–1 || 1–3–0
|- style="background:#cfc;"
| 5 || September 26 || Philadelphia Flyers || 2–1  || 2–3–0
|- style="background:#fcc;"
| 6 || September 28 || @ New York Islanders || 2–4 || 2–4–0
|-

Regular season
The regular season schedule was published on June 25, 2019.

|- style="background:#cfc;"
| 1 || October 3 || Winnipeg || 6–4 || || Lundqvist || Madison Square Garden || 18,006 || 1–0–0 || 2 || 
|- style="background:#cfc;"
| 2 || October 5 || @ Ottawa || 4–1 || || Georgiev || Canadian Tire Centre || 15,135 || 2–0–0 || 4 || 
|- style="background:#fcc;"
| 3 || October 12 || Edmonton || 1–4 || || Lundqvist || Madison Square Garden || 17,177 || 2–1–0 || 4 || 
|- style="background:#fcc;"
| 4 || October 17 || @ New Jersey || 2–5 || || Georgiev || Prudential Center || 16,514 || 2–2–0 || 4 || 
|- style="background:#fcc;"
| 5 || October 18 || @ Washington || 2–5 || || Lundqvist || Capital One Arena || 18,573 || 2–3–0 || 4 || 
|- style="background:#fcc;"
| 6 || October 20 || Vancouver || 2–3 || || Lundqvist || Madison Square Garden || 17,030 || 2–4–0 || 4 || 
|- style="background:#fff;"
| 7 || October 22 || Arizona || 2–3 || OT || Georgiev || Madison Square Garden || 17,435 || 2–4–1 || 5 || 
|- style="background:#cfc;"
| 8 || October 24 || Buffalo || 6–2 || || Lundqvist || Madison Square Garden || 16,913 || 3–4–1 || 7 || 
|- style="background:#fcc;"
| 9 || October 27 || Boston || 4–7 || || Georgiev || Madison Square Garden || 17,144 || 3–5–1 || 7 || 
|- style="background:#cfc;"
| 10 || October 29 || Tampa Bay || 4–1 || || Georgiev || Madison Square Garden || 17,196 || 4–5–1 || 9 || 
|-

|- style="background:#cfc;"
| 11 || November 2 || @ Nashville || 2–1 || || Georgiev || Bridgestone Arena || 17,371 || 5–5–1 || 11 || 
|- style="background:#fcc;"
| 12 || November 4 || Ottawa || 2–6 || || Georgiev || Madison Square Garden || 16,302 || 5–6–1 || 11 || 
|- style="background:#cfc;"
| 13 || November 6 || Detroit || 5–1 || || Lundqvist || Madison Square Garden || 16,804 || 6–6–1 || 13 || 
|- style="background:#cfc;"
| 14 || November 7 || @ Carolina || 4–2 || || Lundqvist || PNC Arena || 13,878 || 7–6–1 || 15 || 
|- style="background:#fff;"
| 15 || November 10 || Florida || 5–6 || SO || Lundqvist || Madison Square Garden || 17,464 || 7–6–2 || 16 || 
|- style="background:#cfc;"
| 16 || November 12 || Pittsburgh || 3–2 || OT || Georgiev || Madison Square Garden || 16,904 || 8–6–2 || 18 || 
|- style="background:#fcc;"
| 17 || November 14 || @ Tampa Bay || 3–9 || || Georgiev || Amalie Arena || 19,092 || 8–7–2 || 18 || 
|- style="background:#fcc;"
| 18 || November 16 || @ Florida || 3–4 || || Lundqvist || BB&T Center || 16,512 || 8–8–2 || 18 || 
|- style="background:#cfc;"
| 19 || November 20 || Washington || 4–1 || || Lundqvist || Madison Square Garden || 17,239 || 9–8–2 || 20 || 
|- style="background:#fcc;"
| 20 || November 22 || @ Ottawa || 1–4 || || Lundqvist || Canadian Tire Centre || 12,349 || 9–9–2 || 20 || 
|- style="background:#cfc;"
| 21 || November 23 || @ Montreal || 6–5 || || Georgiev || Bell Centre || 21,302 || 10–9–2 || 22 || 
|- style="background:#cfc;"
| 22 || November 25 || Minnesota || 3–2 || OT || Lundqvist || Madison Square Garden || 18,006 || 11–9–2 || 24 || 
|- style="background:#cfc;"
| 23 || November 27 || Carolina || 3–2 || || Lundqvist || Madison Square Garden || 17,269 || 12–9–2 || 26 || 
|- style="background:#fff;"
| 24 || November 29 || @ Boston || 2–3 || OT || Lundqvist || TD Garden || 17,850 || 12–9–3 || 27 || 
|- style="background:#cfc;"
| 25 || November 30 || @ New Jersey || 4–0 || || Georgiev || Prudential Center || 16,514 || 13–9–3 || 29 || 
|-

|- style="background:#fcc;"
| 26 || December 2 || Vegas || 1–4 || || Lundqvist || Madison Square Garden || 16,325 || 13–10–3 || 29 || 
|- style="background:#cfc;"
| 27 || December 5 || @ Columbus || 3–2 || || Georgiev || Nationwide Arena || 15,785 || 14–10–3 || 31 || 
|- style="background:#fcc;"
| 28 || December 6 || Montreal || 1–2 || || Georgiev || Madison Square Garden || 17,354 || 14–11–3 || 31 || 
|- style="background:#cfc;"
| 29 || December 8 || @ Vegas || 5–0 || || Georgiev || T-Mobile Arena || 18,236 || 15–11–3 || 33 || 
|- style="background:#fcc;"
| 30 || December 10 || @ Los Angeles || 1–3 || || Lundqvist || Staples Center || 17,826 || 15–12–3 || 33 || 
|- style="background:#cfc;"
| 31 || December 12 || @ San Jose || 6–3 || || Georgiev || SAP Center || 16,381 || 16–12–3 || 35 || 
|- style="background:#fff;"
| 32 || December 14 || @ Anaheim || 3–4 || SO || Lundqvist || Honda Center || 14,707 || 16–12–4 || 36 || 
|- style="background:#fcc;"
| 33 || December 16 || Nashville || 2–5 || || Georgiev || Madison Square Garden || 17,286 || 16–13–4 || 36 || 
|- style="background:#fcc;"
| 34 || December 20 || Toronto || 3–6 || || Georgiev || Madison Square Garden || 16,909 || 16–14–4 || 36 || 
|- style="background:#cfc;"
| 35 || December 22 || Anaheim || 5–1 || || Lundqvist || Madison Square Garden || 17,465 || 17–14–4 || 38 || 
|- style="background:#fcc;"
| 36 || December 23 || @ Philadelphia || 1–5 || || Lundqvist || Wells Fargo Center || 19,776 || 17–15–4 || 38 || 
|- style="background:#cfc;"
| 37 || December 27 || Carolina || 5–3 || || Lundqvist || Madison Square Garden || 17,498 || 18–15–4 || 40 || 
|- style="background:#cfc;"
| 38 || December 28 || @ Toronto || 5–4 || OT || Georgiev || Scotiabank Arena || 19,492 || 19–15–4 || 42 || 
|- style="background:#fcc;"
| 39 || December 31 || @ Edmonton || 5–7 || || Georgiev || Rogers Place || 18,347 || 19–16–4 || 42 || 
|-

|- style="background:#fcc;"
| 40 || January 2 || @ Calgary || 3–4 || || Lundqvist || Scotiabank Saddledome || 19,038 || 19–17–4 || 42 || 
|- style="background:#fcc;"
| 41 || January 4 || @ Vancouver || 1–2 || || Georgiev || Rogers Arena || 18,871 || 19–18–4 || 42 || 
|- style="background:#cfc;"
| 42 || January 7 || Colorado || 5–3 || || Shestyorkin || Madison Square Garden || 17,082 || 20–18–4 || 44 || 
|- style="background:#cfc;"
| 43 || January 9 || New Jersey || 6–3 || || Shestyorkin || Madison Square Garden || 17,007 || 21–18–4 || 46 || 
|- style="background:#fcc;"
| 44 || January 11 || @ St. Louis || 2–5 || || Lundqvist || Enterprise Center || 18,096 || 21–19–4 || 46 || 
|- style="background:#cfc;"
| 45 || January 13 || NY Islanders || 6–2 || || Georgiev || Madison Square Garden || 17,403 || 22–19–4 || 48 || 
|- style="background:#cfc;"
| 46 || January 16 || @ NY Islanders || 3–2 || || Georgiev || Nassau Coliseum || 13,917 || 23–19–4 || 50 || 
|- style="background:#fcc;"
| 47 || January 19 || Columbus || 1–2 || || Shestyorkin || Madison Square Garden || 17,423 || 23–20–4 || 50 || 
|- style="background:#fcc;"
| 48 || January 21 || NY Islanders || 2–4 || || Georgiev || Madison Square Garden || 17,276 || 23–21–4 || 50 || 
|- style="background:#cfc;"
| 49 || January 31 || Detroit || 4–2 || || Shestyorkin || Madison Square Garden || 17,169 || 24–21–4 || 52 || 
|-

|- style="background:#cfc;"
| 50 || February 1 || @ Detroit || 1–0 || || Lundqvist || Little Caesars Arena || 19,515 || 25–21–4 || 54 || 
|- style="background:#fcc;"
| 51 || February 3 || Dallas || 3–5 || || Lundqvist || Madison Square Garden || 15,779 || 25–22–4 || 54 || 
|- style="background:#cfc;"
| 52 || February 5 || Toronto || 5–3 || || Shestyorkin || Madison Square Garden || 17,123 || 26–22–4 || 56 || 
|- style="background:#fcc;"
| 53 || February 7 || Buffalo || 2–3 || || Georgiev || Madison Square Garden || 17,297 || 26–23–4 || 56 || 
|- style="background:#cfc;"
| 54 || February 9 || Los Angeles || 4–1 || || Shestyorkin || Madison Square Garden || 17,237 || 27–23–4 || 58 || 
|- style="background:#cfc;"
| 55 || February 11 || @ Winnipeg || 4–1 || || Shestyorkin || Bell MTS Place || 15,325 || 28–23–4 || 60 || 
|- style="background:#cfc;"
| 56 || February 13 || @ Minnesota || 4–3 || SO || Georgiev || Xcel Energy Center || 17,413 || 29–23–4 || 62 || 
|- style="background:#cfc;"
| 57 || February 14 || @ Columbus || 3–1 || || Georgiev || Nationwide Arena || 18,888 || 30–23–4 || 64 || 
|- style="background:#fcc;"
| 58 || February 16 || Boston || 1–3 || || Georgiev || Madison Square Garden || 18,006 || 30–24–4 || 64 || 
|- style="background:#cfc;"
| 59 || February 19 || @ Chicago || 6–3 || || Shestyorkin || United Center || 21,573 || 31–24–4 || 66 || 
|- style="background:#cfc;"
| 60 || February 21 || @ Carolina || 5–2 || || Shestyorkin || PNC Arena || 18,680 || 32–24–4 || 68 || 
|- style="background:#cfc;"
| 61 || February 22 || San Jose || 3–2 || || Shestyorkin || Madison Square Garden || 18,006 || 33–24–4 || 70 || 
|- style="background:#cfc;"
| 62 || February 25 || @ NY Islanders || 4–3 || OT || Georgiev || Nassau Coliseum || 13,917 || 34–24–4 || 72 || 
|- style="background:#cfc;"
| 63 || February 27 || @ Montreal || 5–2 || || Georgiev || Bell Centre || 20,946 || 35–24–4 || 74 || 
|- style="background:#fcc;"
| 64 || February 28 || @ Philadelphia || 2–5 || || Georgiev || Wells Fargo Center || 19,581 || 35–25–4 || 74 || 
|-

|- style="background:#fcc;"
| 65 || March 1 || Philadelphia || 3–5 || || Lundqvist || Madison Square Garden || 18,006 || 35–26–4 || 74 || 
|- style="background:#fcc;"
| 66 || March 3 || St. Louis || 1–3 || || Georgiev || Madison Square Garden || 16,091 || 35–27–4 || 74 || 
|- style="background:#cfc;"
| 67 || March 5 || Washington || 6–5 || OT || Georgiev || Madison Square Garden || 17,277 || 36–27–4 || 76 || 
|- style="background:#fcc;"
| 68 || March 7 || New Jersey || 4–6 || || Shestyorkin || Madison Square Garden || 17,542 || 36–28–4 || 76 || 
|- style="background:#cfc;"
| 69 || March 10 || @ Dallas || 4–2 || || Shestyorkin || American Airlines Center || 18,195 || 37–28–4 || 78 || 
|- style="background:#fff;"
| 70 || March 11 || @ Colorado || 2–3 || OT || Georgiev || Pepsi Center || 18,025 || 37–28–5 || 79 || 
|-

|- style="background:#;"
| 71 || March 14 || @ Arizona || Gila River Arena
|- style="background:#;"
| 72 || March 16 || Calgary || Madison Square Garden
|- style="background:#;"
| 73 || March 18 || Pittsburgh || Madison Square Garden
|- style="background:#;"
| 74 || March 20 || @ Pittsburgh || PPG Paints Arena
|- style="background:#;"
| 75 || March 22 || @ Buffalo || KeyBank Center
|- style="background:#;"
| 76 || March 24 || Columbus || Madison Square Garden
|- style="background:#;"
| 77 || March 26 || @ Washington || Capital One Arena
|- style="background:#;"
| 78 || March 28 || @ Tampa Bay || Amalie Arena
|- style="background:#;"
| 79 || March 30 || @ Florida || BB&T Center
|- style="background:#;"
| 80 || April 1 || Philadelphia || Madison Square Garden
|- style="background:#;"
| 81 || April 2 || @ Pittsburgh || PPG Paints Arena
|- style="background:#;"
| 82 || April 4 || Chicago || Madison Square Garden
|-

|-
|

Playoffs

The Rangers faced the Carolina Hurricanes in the qualifying round, and were defeated in three games.

|- style="background:#fcc;"
| 1 || August 1 || @ Carolina || 2–3 ||  || Lundqvist || 0–1 || 
|- style="background:#fcc;"
| 2 || August 3 || @ Carolina || 1–4 ||  || Lundqvist || 0–2 || 
|- style="background:#fcc;"
| 3 || August 4 || Carolina || 1–4 ||  || Shestyorkin || 0–3 || 
|-

|-
|

Player statistics
As of August 4, 2020

Skaters

Goaltenders

Awards and honors

Milestones

Records

Transactions
The Rangers have been involved in the following transactions during the 2019–20 season.

Trades

Free agents

Contract terminations

Signings

Draft picks

Below are the New York Rangers' selections at the 2019 NHL Entry Draft, which was held on June 21 and 22, 2019, at Rogers Arena in Vancouver, British Columbia.

Notes:
 The Dallas Stars' second-round pick went to the New York Rangers as the result of a trade on February 23, 2019, that sent Mats Zuccarello to Dallas in exchange for a conditional third-round pick in 2020 and this pick (being conditional at the time of the trade).
 The Tampa Bay Lightning's second-round pick went to the New York Rangers as the result of a trade on February 26, 2018, that sent Ryan McDonagh and J. T. Miller to Tampa Bay in exchange for Vladislav Namestnikov, Libor Hajek, Brett Howden, a first-round pick in 2018 and this pick (being conditional at the time of the trade).
 The Columbus Blue Jackets' fourth-round pick went to the New York Rangers as the result of a trade on February 25, 2019, that sent Adam McQuaid to Columbus in exchange for Julius Bergman, a seventh-round pick in 2019 and this pick.
 The Columbus Blue Jackets' seventh-round pick went to the New York Rangers as the result of a trade on February 25, 2019, that sent Adam McQuaid to Columbus in exchange for Julius Bergman, a fourth-round pick in 2019 and this pick.

References

New York Rangers seasons
New York Rangers
New York Rangers
New York Rangers
New York Rangers
 in Manhattan
Madison Square Garden